Kishori Shahane is an Indian classical and folk dancer and actress who works in the Hindi and Marathi movies and television. - She is married to Hindi filmmaker Deepak Balraj Vij. She is a producer who helped to make a film about the life of Sai Baba of Shirdi. She is known for appearing in shows like Shakti - Astitva Ke Ehsaas Ki and Ishq Mein Marjawan. In 2019 she participated in the reality show Bigg Boss Marathi 2 finishing at the fifth place. Currently she is playing the role of Bhavani Chavan in Ghum Hai Kisikey Pyaar Meiin.

Early life and career 
While at Mithibai College, Kishori was crowned Miss Mithibai at the college known as the cultural hub of Mumbai. She entered into Marathi films and shot to fame with Maherchi Sadi and Wajva Re Wajva. Her stage performances in plays like Moruchi Maushi (Marathi) and Aadhe Adhure (Hindi), directed by Amal Allana bought her recognition as an actress. She worked in Marathi blockbuster films like Ek Daav Dhobi Pachad and Navra Majha Navsacha. Her role in Hindi movies like Pyaar Mein Twist and Red: The Dark Side directed by Vikram Bhatt put forward her ability to play different roles.

Deepak Balraj Vij, a Hindi filmmaker noticed her talent. He did Hafta Band, Bomb Blast and two more films with her. During the making of Hafta Bandh in 1991, they came closer and later got married. Kishori then switched over to Hindi TV serials and continued to work in Hindi and Marathi films. She became popular with her performance in serials like Ghar Ek Mandir, Jassi Jaisi Koi Nahin and Sindoor.

Kishori is a classical and folk dancer. She has performed on stage in India and abroad. She also completed her music video Saavan for Venus. After almost 13 years, she took part in the Mrs. Gladrags Beauty Pageant show and was the Runner-up in 2003.

As a filmmaker, her Marathi film Mohatyachi Renuka won the Maharashtra State Award 2007 for best editing. The film was produced and directed by Kishori. Her next venture Malik Ek (Hindi) was based on the life of Sai Baba and had Jackie Shroff in the lead role. She then launched her next Marathi film Aika Dajiba. She played the role of a transgender in the soap opera Shakti - Astitva Ke Ehsaas Ki, airing on Colors TV, in 2016. Currently, she is seen in the drama series, Ghum Hai Kisikey Pyaar Meiin, playing the role of the matriarch of the Chavan family, Bhavani.

Media image 
In her college days, she was known as Miss Mithabai. She took part in Mrs. Gladrags Beauty Pageant show and became Mrs. Gladrags Runner-up in 2003.

Filmography

Films

Television

Theater

Marathi 
 Moruchi Maushi
 Durga Jhali Gauri
 Mi Tujhya Pathishi Ahe
 Kandapohe Tuzya Ni Mazya Premache
 Mahanatya Sahyadri

Hindi 
 Aadhe Adhure
 Benny And Babloo

Web series

Awards and achievements 

 Classical and folk dances: Live performances on stage all over America, Australia and India
 Miss Mithibai College: 1990
 "Mrs. Gladrags" Beauty Pageant Runner up: 2003
Shining Star of the season of Bigg Boss Marathi 2
ITA Award for Best Actress in a Negative Role: 2022 for Ghum Hai Kisikey Pyaar Meiin

References

External links

 
 

Shahane,Kishori
Actresses in Marathi cinema
Living people
Marathi actors
Actresses in Marathi theatre
Actresses in Hindi cinema
Actresses in Hindi television
Actresses in Marathi television
Indian television actresses
Indian film actresses
20th-century Indian actresses
21st-century Indian actresses
Indian stage actresses
1968 births
Bigg Boss Marathi contestants